Kathleen Marjorie Henderson (née Bell), known as Marje (1905-2000) was an English international badminton player.

Badminton career
Henderson born in 1905  was a four times winner of the All England Open Badminton Championships. She won four consecutive women's doubles with Thelma Kingsbury from 1933-1936. The first success was in her maiden name of Bell.

In addition she won the Scottish Open in 1935, 1937 and 1937.

After marrying James Henderson in 1933 she played under her married name.

Legacy
A plaque commemorates her achievements in her home town of Portsmouth and Henderson claimed that she was the first woman in international badminton to wear shorts.

References

English female badminton players
1905 births
2000 deaths